The Allele Frequency Net Database (abbreviated AlFreD) is a database containing the allele frequencies of immune genes and their corresponding alleles in different populations.

References

External links
 Allele Frequency Net Database

Biological databases
Immunology
Population genetics